Khajan Singh (also Khajan Singh Tokas) (born 6 May 1962) is an Indian swimmer, who remained national swimming champion of India, and won a silver medal at the 1986 Asian Games in Seoul. He was awarded an Arjuna Award by Government of India in 1984.

Early life and education
Born on 6 May 1964 in Munirka village, Khajan went to study at the Government Senior Secondary School, Sarojini Nagar, in Delhi.

Career
He made his debut in competitive swimming by winning five Gold Medals at the National School Championships in 1981-82. Six-Footer Khajana entered the National Aquatics Championship at Delhi in 1982 and outclassed all competitors by winning five Gold, two Silver and one Bronze. The following year at the Nationals in Trivandrum, he stroked his way to seven Gold, two Silver and one Bronze.

Again in the National Aquatic Championship at Ahmedabad in 1987, he not only won seven Gold Medals but also created a national record in the 100 metres freestyle with a timing of 55.21 seconds, breaking his own record of 55.34 seconds set in the 1984 South Asian Games at Kathmandu. He was the undisputed king at the 1988 Nationals at Calcutta making an unprecedented haul of eight individual Gold, five of them gleaming with the additional lustre of new records. He also contributed to a Silver and a Bronze for the police relay team. The ace swimmer, master free style and Arjuna Awardee of 1984, Khajan scored Silver at the 1986 Asian Games in Seoul in 200m Butterfly. That was the first time since 1951 that India won a medal at the Asiad. The next medal in swimming came 24 years later, when Virdhawal Khade won a bronze in the same event at 2010 Asian Games.

His most outstanding international performance was at the South Asian Federation Games (now known South Asian Games), where he won Gold Medals at Kathmandu in 1984 and seven at 2004 South Asian Games at Islamabad in 1989. He won a Bronze at the 1988 Asian Swimming Championships in Beijing and a Silver in the 100 metre butterfly at the world Police Games in 1988.

Khajan represented India in the 12th Commonwealth Games at Brisbane in 1982, IXth Asian Games at Delhi in 1982, 2nd Asian Swimming Championship at Seoul in 1984, friendly International Game at Moscow in 1984. Coached by Australian coach Eric Arnold, Khajan Singh even took part in the 1988 Olympic at Seoul.

Starting a sports officer in his early career, he presently D.I.G. with the Central Reserve Police Force (CRPF).

Personal life
He runs the "Khajan Singh Swimming Academy", located near the Jawaharlal Nehru University (JNU) campus in New Delhi.

In 2010, he along with leading sport persons of the past took part in the Ministry of Youth Affairs and Sports tableau on Commonwealth Games – Delhi 2010, at the 61st Republic Day parade in New Delhi.

References

External links
 
 Khajan Singh Profile
 Khajan Singh Swimming Academy

Living people
Indian male swimmers
Recipients of the Arjuna Award
1964 births
Commonwealth Games competitors for India
Swimmers at the 1982 Commonwealth Games
Olympic swimmers of India
Swimmers at the 1988 Summer Olympics
Indian police officers
Swimmers from Delhi
Asian Games medalists in swimming
Swimmers at the 1986 Asian Games
Swimmers at the 1990 Asian Games
Asian Games silver medalists for India
Male butterfly swimmers
Medalists at the 1986 Asian Games
South Asian Games gold medalists for India
South Asian Games medalists in swimming
20th-century Indian people
21st-century Indian people